Socialist Alternative (England, Wales & Scotland) is a Trotskyist group in Britain, part of International Socialist Alternative. Socialist Alternative's goal is “To rid the world of capitalism and replace it with true democratic socialism".

History

Socialist Alternative was founded in 2019 by over 130 former members of the Socialist Party (England and Wales) who had either resigned or been expelled as the result of a split within the Committee for a Workers' International (CWI), with which the Socialist Party had been aligned.

The majority of the Socialist Party supported a faction that left the CWI to become the Refounded CWI (now known as the CWI). The minority supported what was initially called the CWI-Majority but, has been known since January 2020 as International Socialist Alternative.

International campaigns

Socialist Alternative took part in the KazakhSolidarity campaign supporting protests in Kazakhstan at the beginning of 2022, also supported by a number of other left groups

Covid-19

Socialist Alternative members took part in protests in 2020 related to the UK Government's handling of the COVID-19 pandemic. During a protest in Manchester they criticised the government prioritising "private profit over public health" and demanded the government stepped in to support working people as the furlough scheme was being wound down.

Trade Unions

The Salford branch of Socialist Alternative supported the strike of workers at the CHEP factory in Trafford Park. They argued that these striking workers needed to work together with Kill the Bill protesters against the Police, Crime, Sentencing and Courts Bill and fellow strikers in the University and College Union. Members of the Coventry branch have been active in supporting the strike of refuse collector drivers.

Climate Change
At the COP26 conference in Glasgow, Socialist Alternative provided their part of a lively contingent from ISA on the demonstration. They described the conference as "a collection of hollow promises that still add up to a catastrophic 2.7C of global heating by 2100." Spokesperson Danny said "We need to make sure that COP26 can hear the voice of the working class”

Socialist Feminism
Socialist Alternative claims to be building the socialist-feminist wing of an emerging movement because it is the exploitative, unequal, sexist system of capitalism that provides the basis for gender violence. As part of building this movement they organised a number of demonstrations.

Publications
Apart from their newspaper they have also republished the classic work of revolutionary Marxism by Leon Trotsky, "Marxism in our Time". It has a new introduction by Hugh Caffrey.

See also 

 International Socialist Alternative
 Trotskyism
 Marxism
 Militant tendency
 Leon Trotsky
 Peter Taaffe
 Ted Grant

References

External links 
 Socialist Alternative
 International Socialist Alternative

England, Wales and Scotland
Trotskyist organisations in the United Kingdom
Anti-austerity political parties in the United Kingdom
Militant tendency
Political parties established in 2019